Palwal railway station is a railway station in Palwal, Haryana. Its code is PWL. It is also known as the "hero city of Haryana".

History 

Mahatma Gandhi was arrested in April 1919 from Palwal railway station on his way to Punjab to take part to the Non-cooperation movement meeting. There also a six-foot statue  of Mahatma Gandhi was installed in October 2013.

Infrastructure 
The station consists of ten platforms.

References

External links
 

Railway stations in Palwal district
Delhi railway division